United Front may refer to either of two alliances of the Kuomintang (KMT) and the Communist Party of China (CPC):

 The First United Front, to end warlordism in China, formed in 1923 and collapsed in 1927
 The Second United Front, to resist the Japanese invasion during the Second Sino-Japanese War, which suspended the Chinese Civil War from 1937 to 1941